YMCA College of Physical Education, the first college for physical education of Asia, was established in 1920  by Harry Crowe Buck of Pennsylvania, United States. The college is now affiliated to the Tamil Nadu Physical Education and Sports University.

History
The YMCA Madras was started in 1920 and it started its academic operation from the year 1931, as a first Physical Education college of South Asia with two academic programmes, 'Certificate in Physical Education' and 'Diploma in Physical Education' affiliated to the University of Madras.

Campus
The college, originally located in George Town, a prominent central business district of Chennai, and later shifted to Royapettah. The Nandanam campus of the College, spread over 64.5 acres (261,000 m²) of land, houses several classrooms, gymnasiums, laboratories, a computer centre, a library, and an open-air theatre.

Course
The college offers undergraduates, postgraduates, diploma and other certificate courses in Physical education and sports sciences. Bachelor Of Mobility Science (B.M.S) programme is recognized by Rehabilitation Council of India (RCI).

Initiatives
 The college became co-educational in 1940.
 One of the first colleges of physical education to promote sports for the disabled persons.
 The college has designed orientation and mobility training for blind people.

Sports Medicine
The founder of Indian Institute of Sports Medicine and SPARRC, Dr Kannan Pugazhendi was initially employed here as Medical Officer. Later, he has been the Sports Physician for most of the International Sports Teams in India including Cricket, Hockey and Football.

References

External links
 Official Website

Sport in Chennai
Sport schools in India
Universities and colleges in Chennai
Educational institutions established in 1920
Sports universities and colleges
Universities and colleges founded by the YMCA
Academic institutions formerly affiliated with the University of Madras
1920 establishments in India